Urban renewal (also called urban regeneration in the United Kingdom and urban redevelopment in the United States) is a program of land redevelopment often used to address urban decay in cities. Urban renewal involves the clearing out of blighted areas in inner cities to clear out slums and create opportunities for higher class housing, businesses, and other developments.

A primary purpose of urban renewal is to restore economic viability to a given area by attracting external private and public investment and by encouraging business start-ups and survival. It is controversial for its eventual displacement and destabilization of low-income residents, including African Americans and other marginalized groups.

Historical origins
Modern attempts at renewal began in the late 19th century in developed nations, and experienced an intense phase in the late 1940s under the rubric of reconstruction. The process has had a major impact on many urban landscapes and has played an important role in the history and demographics of cities around the world.

Urban renewal is a process where privately owned properties within a designated renewal area are purchased or taken by eminent domain by a municipal redevelopment authority, razed and then reconveyed to selected developers who devote them to other uses.

The concept of urban renewal as a method for social reform emerged in England as a reaction to the increasingly cramped and unsanitary conditions of the urban poor in the rapidly industrializing cities of the 19th century. The agenda that emerged was a progressive doctrine that assumed better housing conditions would reform its residents morally and economically. Another style of reform – imposed by the state for reasons of aesthetics and efficiency – could be said to have begun in 1853, with the recruitment of Baron Haussmann by Napoleon III for the redevelopment of Paris.

In the 20th and 21st centuries, the practice of urban regeneration is normally completed with one (or more) of three goals, economic renewal, social/cultural renewal, or environmental renewal. Many cities link the revitalization of the central business district and gentrification of residential neighborhoods to earlier urban renewal programs. The goal of urban renewal evolved into a policy based less on destruction and more on renovation and investment, and today is an integral part of many local governments, often combined with small and big business incentives. The aims of which is:

 Tackling barriers to economic growth
 Decreasing the level of unemployment
 Increasing the level of attractiveness for both local residents and investors
 Increasing residents satisfaction in where they live
 Creating opportunities for deprived communities 
 Unlocking potential in deprived areas

The process of urban regeneration is often carried out in rural areas, referred to as village renewal, though it may not be exactly the same in practice.

In some cases, urban renewal may result in urban sprawl when city infrastructure begins to include freeways and expressways.

Controversy
Urban renewal is a widely discussed and controversial program. It has been seen by proponents as an economic engine and a reform mechanism, and by critics as a mechanism for control.  The controversy often involves the use of eminent domain, demolition of historic structures and direct displacement brought by slum clearance. Poorly conceived designs can lead to the destruction of functional neighborhoods and the creation of new ones which are less desirable. Areas are often cleared in order to construct highways, which bring pollution and heavy vehicle traffic to surrounding neighborhoods, or replaced with experimental new development patterns which prove undesirable or not economically sustainable.

In terms of utilizing the eminent domain as a legal method to take private property for city-initiated development, Kelo case is the real-life example of the resistance against eminent use. The U.S. Supreme Court upheld the taking by a 5 to 4 vote, but nothing was built on the taken property. In many US cities, especially those in the Rust Belt, huge areas of productive buildings were demolished to enable speculative future development which never materialized. Syracuse, Cincinnati, and Niagara Falls, among many others, cleared entire neighborhoods under urban renewal plans only to have the cleared areas end up as surface parking lots, sparse industrial uses, and vacant land.

Urban renewal in different countries and regions

Argentina

In Buenos Aires, Argentina, Puerto Madero is a known example of an urban renewal project. In the 1990s, the Argentine government decided to build a new residential and commercial district to replace city's old port and docks. More than 50 skyscrapers have been built in the last 20 years. Puerto Madero is now Buenos Aires' most expensive and exclusive neighborhood.

Brazil
The project aims to redevelop the port area, increasing the city center attractiveness as a whole and enhancing the city's competitiveness in the global economy. The urban renovation involves 700 km of public networks for water supply, sanitation, drainage, electricity, gas and telecom; 5 km of tunnels; 70 km of roads; 650 km2 of sidewalks; 17 km of bike path; 15.000 trees; and 3 plants for sanitation treatment.

Hong Kong
Tackling land shortage in Hong Kong has always been a top priority on the government's agenda, with numerous strategies deployed to increase land supply. One of the current initiatives, noted in the Chief Executive's 2022 Policy Address, is to consolidate property interests and expedite urban renewal.

Israel

Israel has been undergoing extensive urban renewal projects due to the large number of concrete tenement buildings in its cities which do not meet modern Israeli safety standards and have what is widely considered to be an impoverished and unattractive appearance. Israel built large numbers of these tenement buildings, known in Israel as "train buildings" (בנייני רכבת, binyanei rakevet), in the first decades of independence to house masses of Jewish refugees coming from Europe and the Muslim world. Since then, Israeli architectural styles have changed. In addition, these buildings do not meet modern safety regulations: Israeli law has required all new buildings to be built in an earthquake-resistant manner since 1980 and to be built with bomb shelters since 1991. There are two main urban renewal programs: the evacuate and build program and TAMA 38. The evacuate and build program, launched in 1998, allows developers to tear down older building complexes and replace them with larger and more modern buildings, while TAMA 38 enables developers to extensively remodel buildings, strengthening them against earthquakes, adding safety rooms, remodeling the building's appearance, and adding new apartments. In both projects, the tenants are temporarily evacuated for the duration of the work and the developer pays for their alternative accomodation. In both programs, the developers add more apartments so as to sell them to additional tenants and make a profit.

Italy
In Italy, the concept of urban renewal had been having the classical meaning of "recovery", "re-use", and also "redevelopment" for many years. It has not been long time that this meaning has changed, or has begun to change, towards the Anglo-Saxon model taking in account the idea of an action that "determines an increase of economic, cultural, social values in an existing urban or territorial context."

For instance, we can mention the regional law of 29 July 2008, nr. 21, of the Puglia Region, "Norms for urban regeneration", which states: «By this law, the Puglia Region promotes the regeneration of parts of cities and urban systems in coherence with municipal and inter-municipal strategies in order to improve urban, socio-economics, environmental and cultural conditions of human settlements "LEGGE REGIONALE 29 luglio 2008, n. 21: "Norme per la rigenerazione urbana".

A similar concept was carried out by Lombardy Region by mean of its Regional Law of 26 November 2019 - n. 18 "Simplification and incentive measures for urban and territorial regeneration, as well as for the recovery of existing building heritage. Changes and addendums to the regional law 11 March 2005, n. 12 (Law for the Government of the Territory) and other regional laws "Legge Regione Lombardia 18/2019.

This law defines the urban regeneration as "the coordinated set of urban-building interventions and social initiatives that can include replacement, re-use, redevelopment of the built environment and reorganization of the urban landscape by mean of recovery of degraded, underused or abandoned areas, as well as through the creation and management of infrastructure, green spaces and services […] with a horizon towards sustainability and environmental and social resilience, technological innovation and increasing biodiversity" (Art 2. L.R.18/2019).

The same law introduces some rewards reserved to whom builds for social purposes. Moreover, these rewards are also reserved for those who carry on some particular implementation models. For instance, you can increase the volume of your building whenever "integrated safety systems and construction site risk management processes are applied; methods that are based on traceability and control activities, with particular reference to soil movement and waste traceability, based on advanced technologies", the increase in the building index is recognized in the art. 3 and these rewards are also given when technologies as geolocation, video surveillance and perimeter protection are implemented in order to prevent the "risk of crime during all phases of construction sites" La legalità per la rigenerazione urbana: a law analysis.

Morocco
In the French colonial period, the entire city of Marrakesh - the city inside the defensive walls - was razed and redeveloped, except for the preservation of mosques, madrassas, and funerary memorials. The preserved madrassas include buildings erected as caravanserai.

Singapore

The history of Singapore's urban renewal goes back to the time period surrounding the Second World War. Before the war, Singapore's housing environment had already been a problem. The tension of both infrastructure and housing conditions were worsened by the rapidly increasing number of the Singapore population in the 1930s. As a consequence of the war and the lack of economic development, between the 1940s to the 1950s, the previous evil of housing conditions continued to happen. As much as 240,000 squatters were placed in Singapore during the 1950s. It was caused by the movement of migrants, especially from peninsular Malaysia and the baby boom. In mid 1959, overcrowded slums were inhabited by a big number of squatter populations, whereas these areas lacked the existence of service facilities such as sanitation.

Since the establishment of the Republic of Singapore, urban renewal has been included in the part of the national improvement policy that was urgently put in action. Before that, the 1958 master plan had already been designed to solve the city problems. However, due to the lack of urban planning experts caused by the deficiency of professional staff, criticism came from many urban practitioners. The professional team recommended by the United Nations then was asked by the government to cope with the urban renewal matters and its redevelopment plan in 1961. Based on the UN assistance report, two pilot developments were initiated in the end of 1964 by the government. These redevelopments then led to the success of Singapore's urban renewal because the government could provide sufficient amount of public housing and business areas.

In the establishment of urban renewal programmes, some difficulties were experienced by the PAP government. The obstacles came from the resistance of people who used to live in the slums and squatters. It was reported by Singapore newspapers that those people were reluctant to be replaced. This became the major problems of 1960s redevelopment schemes. Affordable land value also became one of its reasons. Another problem was that the government had to purchase the private land owned by the middle and upper society to make the land vacant and be used for redevelopment.

South Korea

Mainland China 
China experienced the fastest urbanization and has one of the greatest urban sprawl scale in the world from 1990. Massive real estate development and reconstruction brought economic revitalization. However, when cleaning the urban decay area, traditional and historic buildings were destroyed to different levels. In the industry, researchers and practitioners used “old town reconstruction” and “urban regeneration” to describe the changes made to the urban decay area. After having more research about urban renewal in terms of international trends and domestic development, the practitioners in the industry built consensus to use “urban renewal” to describe all the changes made to the old town area. With the rapid development pace of urbanization in China, the urbanization rate reached the inflection point of the Northam curve. The city development was not about urban sprawl and real estate development on a large scale. China improved its urban development strategy by using inventory planning other than incremental planning. Chinese promoted urbanization aggressively as national policy. But due to the change from the concept of urban renewal in terms of its presentation from the physical dimension, China now promotes small-scale “repairs” to improve the urban environment in a more sustainable and reasonable way.  At the 15th China Central City Work Conference, the policy, "urban repair and ecological restoration," was put forward.  Immediately thereafter, new urban renewal models such as Guangzhou's micro-renovation and Shanghai's micro-renewal appeared to lead the trend of a new era of urban renewal programs in China.

“Planning is inherently political”, however,  the urban development in China for the past decade is strikingly similar to the situation in many Western countries. In terms of the similarity sharing with U.S. urban renewal programs, both countries viewed older neighborhoods as outdated and blighted, encouraged local governments to cooperate with local development interests for downtown redevelopment, failed to provide enough support and concern for residents of cleared areas, who often were the low-income residents, and building plenty of highways to reach large scale urban sprawl.

Taiwan

 	
In Taipei, Taiwan, Xinyi Special District is a known example of an urban renewal project. Its historical development began in 1976, when the Taipei Municipal Government accepted the proposal to redevelop the area east of the Sun Yat-Sen Memorial Hall. The goal of this redevelopment was to set up a secondary commercial center away from the more crowded old city center (Taipei Station, Ximending area). The redevelopment hoped to increase the prosperity of the eastern district and the convenience of urban life for existing residents. The center's purpose was to expand business investment in the area and attract international financial services and technology firms. It also planned for residential development by building a completely new community. The Xinyi Project Area is the only commercial development area in Taipei with a wholly planned street and urban design. In addition to attracting corporations, it also features large retail spaces, department stores, and shopping malls. Xinyi Special District is now the prime central business district of Taipei.

United Kingdom

From the 1850s onwards, the terrible conditions of the urban poor in the slums of London began to attract the attention of social reformers and philanthropists, who began a movement for social housing. The first area to be targeted was the notorious slum called the Devil's Acre near Westminster. This new movement was largely funded by George Peabody and the Peabody Trust and had a lasting impact on the urban character of Westminster.

Slum clearance began with the Rochester Buildings, on the corner of Old Pye Street and Perkin's Rent, which were built in 1862 by the merchant William Gibbs. They are one of the earliest large-scale philanthropic housing developments in London. The Rochester Buildings were sold to the Peabody Trust in 1877 and later become known as Blocks A to D of the Old Perkin's Rents Estate. Angela Burdett-Coutts, 1st Baroness Burdett-Coutts funded an experimental social housing estate, among the first of its kind, on the corner of Columbia Road and Old Pye Street (now demolished). In 1869, the Peabody Trust built one of its first housing estates at Brewer's Green, between Victoria Street and St. James's Park. What remained of the Devil's Acre on the other side of Victoria Street was cleared and further Peabody estates were built after the Cross Act of 1875.

In 1882, the Peabody Trust built the Abbey Orchard Estate on former marshland at the corner of Old Pye Street and Abbey Orchard Street. Like many of the social housing estates, the Abbey Orchard Estate was built following the square plan concept. Blocks of flats were built around a courtyard, creating a semi-private space within the estate functioning as recreation area. The courtyards were meant to create a community atmosphere and the blocks of flats were designed to allow sunlight into the courtyards. The blocks of flats were built using high-quality brickwork and included architectural features such as lettering, glazing, fixtures and fittings. The estates built in the area at the time were considered model dwellings and included shared laundry and sanitary facilities, innovative at the time, and fireplaces in some bedrooms. The design was subsequently repeated in numerous other housing estates in London.

State intervention was first achieved with the passage of the Public Health Act of 1875 through Parliament. The Act focused on combating filthy urban living conditions that were the cause of disease outbreaks. It required all new residential construction to include running water and an internal drainage system and also prohibited the construction of shoddy housing by building contractors.

The slum clearance began in 1891 and included 730 houses inhabited by 5,719 people. The LCC architects designed 21 and Rowland Plumbe two of 23 blocks containing between 10 and 85 tenements each. A total of 1,069 tenements, mostly two or three-roomed, were planned to accommodate 5,524 persons. The project was hailed as setting "new aesthetic standards for housing the working classes" and included a new laundry, 188 shops, and 77 workshops. Churches and schools were preserved. Building for the project began in 1893 and it was opened by the Prince of Wales in 1900. Other such schemes in the 1880s, where newly cleared sites were sold on to developers, included Whitechapel, Wild Street, Whitecross Street and Clerkenwell.

Currently there are two main Urban Regeneration projects going on in London, Elephant Park at Elephant and Castle and at Stratford. These are both being done by Lendlease, a multinational company focusing on redeveloping neglected city areas.

Interwar period
The 1917 Tudor Walters Committee Report into the provision of housing and post-war reconstruction in the United Kingdom, was commissioned by Parliament as a response to the shocking lack of fitness amongst many recruits during the War; this was attributed to poor living conditions, a belief summed up in a housing poster of the period "you cannot expect to get an A1 population out of C3 homes".

The report's recommendations, coupled with a chronic housing shortage after the First World War led to a government-led program of house building with the slogan 'Homes for Heroes'. Christopher Addison, the Minister for Housing at the time was responsible for the drafting of the Housing, Town Planning, &c. Act 1919 which introduced the new concept of the state being involved in the building of new houses. This marked the start of a long 20th century tradition of state-owned housing, which would much later evolve into council estates.

With the onset of the Great Depression in 1929, increased house building and government expenditure was used to pull the country out of recession. The Housing Act of 1930 gave local councils wide-ranging powers to demolish properties unfit for human habitation or that posed a danger to health, and obligated them to rehouse those people who were relocated due to the large scale slum clearance programs. Cities with a large proportion of Victorian terraced housing – housing that was no longer deemed of sufficient standard for modern living requirements – underwent the greatest changes. Over 5,000 homes (25,000 residents) in the city of Bristol were designated as redevelopment areas in 1933 and slated for demolition. Although efforts were made to house the victims of the demolitions in the same area as before, in practice this was too difficult to fully implement and many people were rehoused in other areas, even different cities. In an effort to rehouse the poorest people affected by redevelopment, the rent for housing was set at an artificially low level, although this policy also only achieved mixed success.

The Josefov neighborhood, or Old Jewish Quarter, in Prague was leveled and rebuilt in an effort at urban renewal between 1890 and 1913.

Other programs, such as that in Castleford in the United Kingdom and known as The Castleford Project seek to establish a process of urban renewal which enables local citizens to have greater control and ownership of the direction of their community and the way in which it overcomes market failure. This supports important themes in urban renewal today, such as participation, sustainability and trust – and government acting as advocate and 'enabler', rather than an instrument of command and control.

During the 1990s the concept of culture-led regeneration gained ground. Examples most often cited as successes include Temple Bar in Dublin where tourism was attracted to a bohemian 'cultural quarter', Barcelona where the 1992 Olympics provided a catalyst for infrastructure improvements and the redevelopment of the water front area, and Bilbao where the building of a new art museum was the focus for a new business district around the city's derelict dock area. The approach has become very popular in the UK due to the availability of lottery funding for capital projects and the vibrancy of the cultural and creative sectors. However, the arrival of Tate Modern in the London borough of Southwark may be heralded as a catalyst to economic revival in its surrounding neighborhood.

In post-apartheid South Africa major grassroots social movements such as the Western Cape Anti-Eviction Campaign and Abahlali baseMjondolo emerged to contest 'urban renewal' programs that forcibly relocated the poor out of the cities.

The politics of urban renewal which frequently relies on the state's dominance in the discourse of removing the character and infrastructure of older city cores, with that which is required by existing market based constituents has to be examined further. Professor Kenneth Paul Tan of the National University of Singapore has this to say "Singapore's self-image of having achieved success against all odds puts tremendous pressure on its government and people to maintain and exceed this success. The push for progress and development destroys many things in its path, often indiscriminately, sometimes unwittingly. To cope psychically with such losses, Singapore's culture of comfort and affluence has been attained through the self-mastery of repressive techniques. Desiring economic progress, upward mobility, affluent and convenient lifestyles and a ‘world-class’ city."

"Singaporeans have had to repress the loss of their sense of place and community, family ties, passion and compassion, Asian customs and values, openness to the rest of the world and even the discipline, hard work and thrift associated with earlier capitalist–industrial attitudes. But no repressive efforts can be complete, consistent and fully successful, even in dominant hegemony. Therefore, the ‘now’ is always a complex and fractured world of disjunctive values, attitudes and ideals. The supernatural intrusions featured in these five films should tell us something about the impossibility of a coherent world of ideology and experience."

United States

1900 to 1950s

Urban renewal projects in the United States have included the design and construction of Central Park in New York and the 1909 Plan for Chicago by Daniel Burnham. Similarly, the efforts of Jacob Riis in advocating for the demolition of degraded areas of New York in the late 19th century were also formative. The redevelopment of large sections of New York City and New York State by Robert Moses between the 1930s and the 1970s was a notable and prominent example of urban redevelopment. Moses directed the construction of new bridges, highways, housing projects, and public parks.

Other cities across the USA began to create redevelopment programs in the late 1930s and 1940s. These early projects were generally focused on slum clearance and were implemented by local public housing authorities, which were responsible both for clearing slums and for building new affordable housing. The City Planning and Housing Council (CHPC) founded in 1937 had a large hand in the reconstruction of urban slums, with their primary mission being the elimination of poor housing conditions, creating less crowded and cleaner public housing.

In 1944, the GI Bill (officially the Serviceman's Readjustment Act) guaranteed Veterans Administration (VA) mortgages to veterans under favorable terms, which fueled suburbanization after the end of World War II, as places like Levittown, New York, Warren, Michigan and the San Fernando Valley of Los Angeles were transformed from farmland into cities occupied by tens of thousands of families in a few years. However, the GI Bill was primarily beneficial for white veterans over black ones, so in inner cities where black veterans tried using the benefits from the GI bill to occur housing and/or jobs, it was much more difficult.

The Housing Act of 1949, also known as the Taft-Ellender-Wagner Act, provided federal loans to cities to acquire and clear slum areas to be sold to private developers to redevelop in accordance with a plan prepared by the city (normally with new housing), and grants to cover two-thirds of the portion of the city's costs in excess of the sale prices received from the developers, as well as provide millions of dollars to create public housing throughout the country. The phrase used at the time was "urban redevelopment". "Urban renewal" was a phrase popularized with the passage of the Housing Act of 1954, which made these projects more enticing to developers by, among other things, providing mortgages backed by the Federal Housing Administration (FHA).

The term "urban renewal" was not introduced in the USA until the Housing Act was again amended in 1954. That was also the year in which the U.S. Supreme Court upheld the general validity of urban redevelopment statutes in the landmark case, Berman v. Parker.

Under the powerful influence of multimillionaire R.K. Mellon, Pittsburgh became the first major city to undertake a modern urban-renewal program in May 1950. Pittsburgh was infamous around the world as one of the dirtiest and most economically depressed cities, and seemed ripe for urban renewal. A large section of downtown at the heart of the city was demolished, converted to parks, office buildings, and a sports arena and renamed the Golden Triangle in what was generally recognized as a major success. Other neighborhoods were also subjected to urban renewal, but with mixed results. Some areas did improve, while other areas, such as East Liberty and the Hill District, declined following ambitious projects that shifted traffic patterns, blocked streets to vehicular traffic, isolated or divided neighborhoods with highways, and removed large numbers of ethnic and minority residents. An entire neighborhood was destroyed (to be replaced by the Civic Arena), displacing 8000 residents (most of whom were poor and black).

Because of the ways in which it targeted the most disadvantaged sector of the American population, novelist James Baldwin famously dubbed Urban Renewal "Negro Removal" in the 1960s.

Early to mid-20th century Detroit was a prime area for urban "redevelopers", as much of the city had only decrepit housing available. The efforts of the CHPC and the FHA to renew Detroit caused huge amounts of black displacement due to the construction of highways and airports directly through black neighborhoods like 8-mile and Paradise Valley. Black families were thrown out from their homes and not provided relocation services. The "slums" being cleared or being looked at for redevelopment were primarily black neighborhoods.

In 1956, the Federal-Aid Highway Act gave state and federal government complete control over new highways, and often they were routed directly through vibrant urban neighborhoods—isolating or destroying many—since the focus of the program was to bring traffic in and out of the central cores of cities as expeditiously as possible and nine out of every ten dollars spent came from the federal government. This resulted in a serious degradation of the tax bases of many cities, isolated entire neighborhoods, and meant that existing commercial districts were bypassed by the majority of commuters. Segregation continued to increase as communities were displaced. Black families that had their homes and neighborhoods destroyed had to find housing options deeper in the inner city as whites could then use those highways to spread further and further into the suburbs but continue to work in the city.

In Boston, one of the country's oldest cities, almost a third of the old city was demolished—including the historic West End—to make way for a new highway, low- and moderate-income high-rises (which eventually became luxury housing), and new government and commercial buildings. This came to be seen as a tragedy by many residents and urban planners, and one of the centerpieces of the redevelopment—Government Center—is still considered an example of the excesses of urban renewal.

Reaction against urban renewal
In 1961, Jane Jacobs published The Death and Life of Great American Cities, one of the first—and strongest—critiques of contemporary large-scale urban renewal. However, it would still be a few years before organized movements began to oppose urban renewal. The Rondout neighborhood in Kingston, New York (on the Hudson River) was essentially destroyed by a federally funded urban renewal program in the 1960s, with more than 400 old buildings demolished, most of them historic brick structures built in the 19th century. Similarly ill-conceived urban renewal programs gutted the historic centers of other towns and cities across America in the 1950s and 1960s (for example the West End neighborhood in Boston, the Gateway District of Minneapolis, the downtown area of Norfolk, Virginia and the historic waterfront areas of the towns of Narragansett and Newport in Rhode Island).

The Civil Rights Act of 1964 is a landmark law to discard discrimination based on race, gender, religion, sex, national origin, and later sexual orientation and gender identity through legal means. At this time, racial deed restrictions on housing were legally removed and banned, which was an important step for Desegregation in the United States. However, redlining still existed to present the unequal real estate transaction for many ethnic minorities. Even though segregation was explicitly illegal,  discrimination under urban planning context has been deep-rooted.

From 1965 to 1967,  riots swept many cities across the States—most drastically in Detroit during the 12th Street Riot. By the 1970s many major cities developed opposition to the sweeping urban-renewal plans for their cities. In Boston, community activists halted construction of the proposed Southwest Expressway but only after a three-mile long stretch of land had been cleared. In San Francisco, Joseph Alioto was the first mayor to publicly repudiate the policy of urban renewal, and with the backing of community groups, forced the state to end construction of highways through the heart of the city. Atlanta lost over 60,000 people between 1960 and 1970 because of urban renewal and expressway construction, but a downtown building boom turned the city into the showcase of the New South in the 1970s and 1980s. In the early 1970s in Toronto, Jacobs was heavily involved in a group which halted the construction of the Spadina Expressway and altered transport policy in that city.

Some of the policies around urban renewal began to change under President Lyndon Johnson and the War on Poverty, and in 1968, the Housing and Urban Development Act and The New Communities Act of 1968 guaranteed private financing for private entrepreneurs to plan and develop new communities. Subsequently, the Housing and Community Development Act of 1974 established the Community Development Block Grant program (CDBG) which began in earnest the focus on redevelopment of existing neighborhoods and properties, rather than demolition of substandard housing and economically depressed areas.

Until 1970, the displaced owners and tenants received only the constitutionally-mandated "just compensation" specified in the Fifth Amendment to the U.S. Constitution. This measure of compensation covered only the fair market value of the taken property, and omitted compensation for a variety of incidental losses like, for example, moving expenses, loss of favorable financing and notably, business losses, such as loss of business goodwill. In the 1970s the federal government and state governments enacted the Uniform Relocation Assistance Act which provides for limited compensation of some of these losses. However the Act denies the displaced land owners the right to sue to enforce its provisions, so it is deemed an act of legislative grace rather than a constitutional right. Historically, urban redevelopment has been controversial because of such practices as taking private property by eminent domain for "public use" and then turning it over to redevelopers free of charge or for less than the acquisition cost (known as "land write-down"). Thus, in the controversial Connecticut case of Kelo v. City of New London (2005) the plan called for a redeveloper to lease the subject 90-acre waterfront property for $1 per year.

Currently, a mix of renovation, selective demolition, commercial development, and tax incentives is most often used to revitalize urban neighborhoods. An example of an entire eradication of a community is Africville in Halifax, Nova Scotia. Gentrification is still controversial, and often results in familiar patterns of poorer residents being priced out of urban areas into suburbs or more depressed areas of cities. Some programs, such as that administered by Fresh Ministries and Operation New Hope in Jacksonville, Florida, and the Hill Community Development Corporation (Hill CDC) in Pittsburgh's historic Hill District attempt to develop communities, while at the same time combining highly favorable loan programs with financial literacy education so that poorer residents are not displaced.

Niagara Falls, New York

An example of urban renewal gone wrong in the United States is in downtown Niagara Falls, New York. Most of the original downtown was demolished in the 1960s, and many replacement projects including the Rainbow Centre Factory Outlet, Niagara Falls Convention and Civic Center, the Native American Cultural Center, the Hooker Chemical (later the Occidental Petroleum) Headquarters building, the Wintergarden, the Fallsville Splash Park, a large parking ramp, an enclosed pedestrian walkway, the Falls Street Faire & Falls Street Station entertainment complexes, sections of the Robert Moses State Parkway, and the Mayor E. Dent Lackey Plaza closed within twenty to thirty years of their construction. In several American cities, some demolished blocks were never replaced.

Ultimately, the former tourist district of the city along Falls Street was destroyed. It went against the principles of several urban philosophers, such as Jane Jacobs, who claimed that mixed-use districts were needed (which the new downtown was not) and arteries needed to be kept open. Smaller buildings also should be built or kept. In Niagara Falls, however, the convention center blocked traffic into the city, located in the center of Falls Street (the main artery), and the Wintergarden also blocked traffic from the convention center to the Niagara Falls. The Rainbow Centre interrupted the street grid, taking up three blocks, and parking ramps isolated the city from the core, leading to the degradation of nearby neighborhoods. Tourists were forced to walk around the Rainbow Center, the Wintergarden, and the Quality Inn (all of which were adjacent), in total five blocks, discouraging small business in the city.

Pros and cons 

Urban renewal sometimes lives up to the hopes of its original proponents – it has been assessed by politicians, urban planners, civic leaders, and residents – it has played an undeniably important if controversial role. But at other times urban redevelopment projects have failed in several American cities, having wasted large amounts of public funds to no purpose.

Replenished housing stock might be an improvement in quality; it may increase density and reduce sprawl; it might have economic benefits and improve the global economic competitiveness of a city's centre. It may, in some instances, improve cultural and social amenity, and it may also improve opportunities for safety and surveillance. Developments such as London Docklands increased tax revenues for government.

In late 1964, the British commentator Neil Wates expressed the opinion that urban renewal in the United States had 'demonstrated the tremendous advantages which flow from an urban renewal programme,' such as remedying the 'personal problems' of the poor, creation or renovation of housing stock, educational and cultural 'opportunities'. In the United States successful urban redevelopment projects tend to revitalize downtown areas, but have not been successful in revitalizing cities as a whole. The process has often resulted in the displacement of low-income city inhabitants when their dwellings were taken and demolished. Eventually, urban redevelopment became an engine of construction of shopping malls, automobile factories and dealerships, "large box" department stores (like Target, Costco and Best Buy). Thus, in Washington, DC, the famous (or notorious) Southwest Washington renewal project (see Berman v. Parker) displaced thousands of largely African-American families, but provided them with no replacement housing because at the time (1954) the law did not provide for any. Also, the version of the project that was approved by the U.S. Supreme Court in Berman, provided for low-cost replacement housing, one-third of which was to rent for $17/room/month, but after the court's decision, that provision in the local law was repealed.

Replacement housing – particularly in the form of high-rise housing for low-income tenants – has not been successful. Hostile architectural designs, together with low-quality construction and maintenance have often led to rapid deterioration and abandonment of these projects.  Public housing projects like Cabrini-Green in Chicago and Pruitt-Igoe in St. Louis became so bad that they had to be demolished.

Moreover, as an important method of urban renewal project, slum clearance seemed very effective in cleaning the city environment but failed in solving the real social problems that causes slums. And low-income residents were forced to move out of their communities, which is considered as direct displacement. Moreover, urban renewal is highly like to open the door for gentrification, which leads to the outcome that the high middle-class residents take place of the urban renewal area by making the rising housing price no longer affordable by low-income residents. It's an outcome of indirect displacement. The threatened groups also sometimes suffer from social inequalities due to discrimination on racial identity.

In 2000, the Portland, Oregon city leaders' promised to make amends for its treatment of local African-Americans, whose communities had decimated through the local urban renewal program. The promise said money spent in North and Northeast Portland would benefit the poor, the elderly and people of color, but after 16 years, the city leaders failed in fulfilling the promise. In these years, white developers leveraged city cash into multimillion-dollar apartment projects, the increasing prices force the African-American and other low-income residents out of the market.

See also

 Adaptive reuse
 Big City Plan
 Community development
 Cost overrun
 Environmental racism
 Gentrification
 Housing Market Renewal Initiative
 List of planned cities
 List of urban planners
 Megaproject
 New town
 New Urbanism
 Overspill estate
 Phase I environmental site assessment
 Principles of Intelligent Urbanism
 Slum upgrading
 Temporary use
 Urban economics
 Urban renaissance
 Urban vitality

References

Further reading
 Klemek, Christopher (2011). The Transatlantic Collapse of Urban Renewal, Postwar Urbanism from New York to Berlin. Chicago: Univ. of Chicago Press. .
 Grogan, Paul, Proscio, Tony, Comeback Cities: A Blueprint for Urban Neighborhood Revival, 2000. (Business Week review of "Comeback Cities")
Cohen, Lizabeth, Saving American Cities: Ed Logue and the Struggle to Renew Urban America in the Suburban Age (Farrar, Straus and Giroux, 2019).
 Pernice, Nicolas M., M.S. "Urban redevelopment of Lawrence, MA a retrospective case study of the Plains Neighborhood", 2011, 136 pages 
 Zipp, Samuel. Manhattan Projects: Rise & Fall of Urban Renewal in Cold War New York. New York: Oxford University Press, 2010.
Lavine, Amy. Urban Renewal and the Story of Berman v. Parker. vol. 42 The Urban Lawyer 423 (2010), https://www.jstor.org/stable/27895791

 
Government aid programs